The High Sheriff of Sligo was the British Crown's judicial representative in County Sligo, Ireland, from the 16th century until 1922, when the office was abolished in the new Free State and replaced by the office of Sligo County Sheriff. The sheriff had judicial, electoral, ceremonial and administrative functions and executed High Court Writs. In 1908, an Order in Council made the Lord-Lieutenant the Sovereign's prime representative in a county and reduced the High Sheriff's precedence. However the sheriff retained his responsibilities for the preservation of law and order in the county. The usual procedure for appointing the sheriff from 1660 onwards was that three persons were nominated at the beginning of each year from the county and the Lord Lieutenant then appointed his choice as High Sheriff for the remainder of the year. Often the other nominees were appointed as under-sheriffs. Sometimes a sheriff did not fulfil his entire term through death or other event and another sheriff was then appointed for the remainder of the year. The dates given hereunder are the dates of appointment. All addresses are in County Sligo unless stated otherwise.

Sligo was constituted a county in 1568 by Sir Henry Sidney, Lord Deputy of Ireland, but a sheriff does not appear to have been appointed until the year 1576 at the request of the O'Connor Sligo.

High Sheriffs of County Sligo
 Source: History of Sligo

18th century

19th century

20th century
1900:
1902: Henry McCarrick of Kilglass House, Ballina.
1903: Arthur Cooper O'Hara.
1904: Sir Josslyn Augustus Richard Gore-Booth, 6th Baronet.
1905:
1908: Bryan Ricco Cooper of Markree Castle.
1910: Roger Kennedy Parke.
1911: Frederick William O'Hara.
1912:
1914: Christopher Guy Orme.
1915: Charles John Boyle of The Priory, Gt. Milton, Wallingford.
1916: Colonel James Nicholson Soden Kirkwood, Woodbrook, Co. Roscommon/Carrowmabla, Co. Sligo.
1918: R.E. O'Hara.

References

Sligo
History of County Sligo